Celia was a  naval trawler, launched in late 1940. She served through World War II as a minesweeper and was sold in 1946.

Description
They were generally armed with a 12 pounder  quick firing low angle gun and 3 x 20mm Oerlikons on single mountings.

History
Celia was ordered by Amos & Smith on 12 December 1939. She was built by Cochrane & Sons, Ltd, Selby Yorkshire. Her keel was laid on 25 May 1940 and she was launched on 15 September.

Celia was commissioned on 12 January 1941. She carried the pennant number T134. She took part in a number of convoys during World War II.

1941
Celia was one of the escorts of Convoy EN 66, which departed from Methil, Fife, on 3 February and arrived at Oban, Argyllshire, on 6 February. She was one of the escorts of Convoy WN 97, which departed from the Clyde on 10 March and arrived at Methil on 14 March. Celia was one of the escorts of Convoy ON 29, which departed from Liverpool, Lancashire on 22 October. She was an escort of Convoy QP 2, which departed from Archangelsk, Soviet Union on 3 November and arrived at Kirkwall, Orkney Islands on 17 November. Celia was part of the escort from 11–13 November.

1942
Celia was one of the escorts of Convoy PQ 13, which departed from Loch Ewe on 10 March and arrived at Murmansk, Soviet Union on 31 March. She was one of the escorts of Convoy UR 23, which departed from Loch Ewe on 8 May and arrived at Reykjavík, Iceland on 11 May.

Celia was sold into merchant service in 1946.

References

Shakespearian-class trawlers
Ships built in Selby
1940 ships
World War II patrol vessels of the United Kingdom
Merchant ships of the United Kingdom
Steamships of the United Kingdom